It was a fort in the Roman province of Dacia.

Fortification of historical significance, the castra of Tihău was called since the 18th century "citadel of Tuhutum". Ruins on the plateau "Grădiște" shows that the Castra of Tihău was a Roman fort of auxiliary troop, pertaining to the northwest sector of Dacic limes. Repeated discoveries of Roman archaeological materials (pottery, tiles and bricks, arms, tools, diverse objects, tegular stamps, coins, even stone inscriptions etc.), advanced knowledges in the realm of history and archeology of Roman Dacia, all together, confirm the nature, the chronological placement, appurtenance and Roman military-defensive role of "fort" that formerly erected in this place from the confluence of Almaș and Someș River.

The castra was known and put on contribution in the debate of various military issues of Roman Dacia-based only on few fortuitous discoveries and some land surface observations.

Excavations
First systematic excavations, that actually were only information surveys, were taken in 1958, within the pale of archaeological site of Porolissum, where performed its works a large group of researchers, led by regretted professor Mihail Macrea. Of his commission and modest funds provided by the Museum of Zalău, they began the excavations at the castra, excavations that were conceived to unfold several years and would receive a greater ampleness. But, unfortunately, the excavations were limited to 1958, to what they could do then, not to be resumed. Otherwise, excavations from Porolissum were stopped the following year, because the same reasons of deformed and arbitrary historical photics. After 36 years, the researches were resumed and continued, through a collaboration between Institute of Archaeology and Art History in Cluj-Napoca and Museum of History and Art in Zalău.

Geographical and strategical position
The castra is located on a plateau called by villagers "Grădiște" or "Cetate", plateau placed to the left of Someș River, before its confluence with Almaș River and at about 120 m in the left of Jibou-Dej road. From the plateau, whose plots belonged to Tihău inhabitants (commune of Surduc), it opens a wide view over the valley of Someș River to Jibou, 8 km westwards, to the village of Ciocmani, northwards, and southwards, on the valley of Almaș River, to the village of Gâlgău Almașului. Only eastwards the perspective closes by nearby hills, that stretch along the valley of Gârbou River and to the namesake village. It's a nodal strategic point, excellently chosen for a Roman castra on the frontier of Dacia Porolissensis (additional province organized in 124 AD), castrat that blocked the main pathways of a potential external attack to the northwestern Roman Dacia territories. Actually, westwards, horizon is far closed, beyond Jibou, to the hills in Popteleac-Mirșid-Creaca-Moigrad (Porolissum) area.

See also
List of castra

References

External links
Roman castra from Romania - Google Maps / Earth

Notes

Roman legionary fortresses in Dacia
Roman legionary fortresses in Romania
History of Crișana
Historic monuments in Sălaj County